The Maungakōtukutuku Stream is a stream on the Kapiti Coast of New Zealand's North Island.  Its headwaters are in the Maungakotukutuku area and it is a tributary of the Waikanae River.  Consideration has been given to damming the stream in order to increase the Kapiti Coast's water supply.

References
 Proposed Dam Site, Kapiti Coast District: Prefeasibility Fault Hazard Assessment (PDF file)

Rivers of the Wellington Region
Rivers of New Zealand